Bang Luang Mosque is a historic mosque in Bangkok located in Soi Arun Amarin 7, New Arun Amarin Road, Wat Kanlaya Subdistrict, Thon Buri District, Thonburi side within Kudi Khao Community by the Khlong Bangkok Yai (formerly Khlong Bang Luang) near mouth of  Chao Phraya River, it's also known as Kudi Khao (กุฎีขาว; lit: white  cloister) and Kudi To Yi (กุฎีโต๊ะหยี; To Yi's  cloister).

This mosque was built in the early Rattanakosin period (approx. 1784) during the reign of King Phutthayotfa Chulalok (Rama I) by a Muslim merchant named "To Yi" (โต๊ะหยี). The mosque is decorated with Thai brick and painted in white color, which got the Mosque name. It is the only Thai-style mosque in the world, decorated with three-tiered art including Thai, Chinese and European. There's embodiment of the spirit of the goddess reflecting the devotion of Allah. Furthermore, they're tombs located in front of the mosque and the mosque is now being classified as “Unseen in Bangkok” tourist destination.

Bang Luang Mosque is not far away from other religious houses of worship viz Wat Prayurawongsawat, Wat Kalayanamitr, Santa Cruz Church and Kian Un Keng Shrine. Also opposite the old mosque is another important one, Tonson Mosque.

References

External links

1784 establishments in Siam
Religious buildings and structures completed in 1784
Mosques in Thailand
Tourist attractions in Bangkok
Religious buildings and structures in Bangkok
Thon Buri district
Unregistered ancient monuments in Bangkok